Mbozi may refer to:

Mbozi District, Tanzania
Mbozi meteorite
Mbozi Languages, a group of languages in Zambia and Tanzania